Ralph Jack Richard Mecredy (12 July 1888 – 1968) was an Irish cyclist who competed for Great Britain in two events at the 1912 Summer Olympics. He was the son of Irish champion cyclist Richard J. Mecredy.

Mecredy was educated at Trinity College Dublin.  While he was there, he was known for winning both athletic (track and field) events and cycling events on the same day, which the Irish Post and Weekly Telegraph claimed, "a feat for which we believe the history of the college races does not afford a parallel."

From 1913 to 1915 he spent time studying medicine in the US. He was on board the RMS Lusitania when it sank in 1915, and was lucky to survive.

References

External links
 

1888 births
1968 deaths
British male cyclists
Irish male cyclists
Olympic cyclists of Great Britain
Cyclists at the 1912 Summer Olympics
Sportspeople from Dublin (city)
Alumni of Trinity College Dublin